Ashapur is a village in Pindra Tehsil of Varanasi district in the Indian state of Uttar Pradesh. Ashapur falls under Bagwanpur gram panchayat. The village is about 17 kilometres North of Varanasi district and 298 kilometres south-east of state capital Lucknow.

Demography
Ashapur has a total population of 316 people amongst 53 families. Sex ratio of Ashapur is 848 and child sex ratio is 615. Uttar Pradesh state average for both ratios is 912 and 902 respectively .

See also

Pindra Tehsil
Pindra (Assembly constituency)

Notes
  All demographic data is based on 2011 Census of India.

References 

Villages in Varanasi district